The Numismatic Society of India (NSI) is the foremost numismatic society in India. It was founded in 1910 by a group of (mainly) expatriate Englishmen associated with British rule in India. The founding members were Rev. G.P. Taylor, Sir Richard Burn, H.R. Nevil, H.N. Wright, R.B. Whitehead and Framji Thanawala. The first President was Sir John Stanley, Chief Justice of the Allahabad High Court. R. B. Whitehead was the first Honorary Fellow of the Numismatic Society of India. NSI is situated within the Banaras Hindu University campus.

Selected publications
Journal (digitised editions only)
The journal of the Numismatic Society of India Vol. I, 1939.  (1972 reprint)
The journal of the Numismatic Society of India Vol. III, 1941. (1973 reprint)
The journal of the Numismatic Society of India Vol. VII, 1945, Parts I & II. Professor H.S. Hodiwala commemoration volume. (1976 reprint)
Index
Gupta, Parmeshwari Lal. (1950) Index to the Journal of the Numismatic Society of India Vols. I to X (1939–1948). Bombay: The Numismatic Society of India.

Medals and awards
The Numismatic Society of India recognizes academic achievement by conferring the following awards:
Nelson Wright Medal in Bronze
Akbar Silver Medal
Chakra Vikram Medal of Gold and Silver
C.H. Bidulph Bronze Medal
Prof. M. Rama Rao Medal
Shree T. Desikachari Silver Medal
Prof. M.H. Krishna-Mythic Society Silver Medal

References

India
Numismatic Society
Numismatic Society
Awards for numismatics